The bowling competition at the 2018 Central American and Caribbean Games was held from 26 July to 2 August at the Bolera de Cali in Cali, Colombia .

Medal summary

Men's events

Women's events

Medal table

References

External links
2018 Central American and Caribbean Games – Bowling

2018 Central American and Caribbean Games events
Central American and Caribbean Games
2018
Qualification tournaments for the 2019 Pan American Games